In geometry, the Wythoff symbol is a notation representing a Wythoff construction of a uniform polyhedron or plane tiling within a Schwarz triangle. It was first used by Coxeter, Longuet-Higgins and Miller in their enumeration of the uniform polyhedra. Later the Coxeter diagram was developed to mark uniform polytopes and honeycombs in n-dimensional space within a fundamental simplex. 

A Wythoff symbol consists of three numbers and a vertical bar. It represents one uniform polyhedron or tiling, although the same tiling/polyhedron can have different Wythoff symbols from different symmetry generators. For example, the regular cube can be represented by 3 | 2 4 with Oh symmetry, and 2 4 | 2 as a square prism with 2 colors and D4h symmetry, as well as 2 2 2 | with 3 colors and D2h symmetry.

With a slight extension, Wythoff's symbol can be applied to all uniform polyhedra. However, the construction methods do not lead to all uniform tilings in Euclidean or hyperbolic space.

Description 
The Wythoff construction begins by choosing a generator point on a fundamental triangle. This point must be chosen at equal distance from all edges that it does not lie on, and a perpendicular line is then dropped from it to each such edge.

The triangle is also represented with the same numbers, written (p q r). The vertical bar in the symbol specifies a categorical position of the generator point within the fundamental triangle according to the following:
 indicates that the generator lies on the corner p,
 indicates that the generator lies on the edge between p and q,
 indicates that the generator lies in the interior of the triangle.
In this notation the mirrors are labeled by the reflection-order of the opposite vertex. The p, q, r values are listed before the bar if the corresponding mirror is active.

A special use is the symbol  which is designated for the case where all mirrors are active, but odd-numbered reflected images are ignored. The resulting figure has rotational symmetry only.

The generator point can either be on or off each mirror, activated or not. This distinction creates 8 (23) possible forms, but the one where the generator point is on all the mirrors is impossible. The symbol that would normally refer to that is reused for the snub tilings.

The Wythoff symbol is functionally similar to the more general Coxeter-Dynkin diagram, in which each node represents a mirror and the arcs between them – marked with numbers – the angles between the mirrors. (An arc representing a right angle is omitted.) A node is circled if the generator point is not on the mirror.

Example spherical, euclidean and hyperbolic tilings on right triangles 

The fundamental triangles are drawn in alternating colors as mirror images. The sequence of triangles (p 3 2) change from spherical (p = 3, 4, 5), to Euclidean (p = 6), to hyperbolic (p ≥ 7). Hyperbolic tilings are shown as a Poincaré disk projection.

See also 
Regular polytope
Regular polyhedron
List of uniform tilings
Uniform tilings in hyperbolic plane
List of uniform polyhedra
List of uniform polyhedra by Schwarz triangle
Lists of uniform tilings on the sphere, plane, and hyperbolic plane

References 
 Coxeter Regular Polytopes, Third edition, (1973), Dover edition,  (Chapter V: The Kaleidoscope, Section: 5.7 Wythoff's construction)
 Coxeter The Beauty of Geometry: Twelve Essays, Dover Publications, 1999,  (Chapter 3: Wythoff's Construction for Uniform Polytopes)
 Coxeter, Longuet-Higgins, Miller, Uniform polyhedra, Phil. Trans. 1954, 246 A, 401–50.
  pp. 9–10.

External links
 
The Wythoff symbol 
Wythoff symbol 
Greg Egan's applet to display uniform polyhedra using Wythoff's construction method
A Shadertoy renderization of Wythoff's construction method
KaleidoTile 3 Free educational software for Windows by Jeffrey Weeks that generated many of the images on the page.
 

Polyhedra
Polytopes
Mathematical notation

ja:ワイソフ記号